Noé is a commune in the Haute-Garonne department, Southwestern France.

Population

Transport
 Gare de Longages-Noé

See also
Communes of the Haute-Garonne department

References

Communes of Haute-Garonne